Oh Hyeon-gyu (born 12 April 2001) is a South Korean professional footballer who plays as a forward for Scottish Premiership club Celtic and the South Korea national team.

Club career

Suwon Samsung Bluewings
Oh made his professional debut in K League 1 with Suwon Samsung Bluewings during the 2019 season, making eleven league appearances. He spent the next two seasons on loan at military club Sangju Sangmu (renamed Gimcheon Sangmu in 2021), where he served his military service. He returned to the Bluewings in the 2022 season and was the club's top scorer with 13 goals.

Celtic
On 25 January 2023, Oh joined Scottish Premiership club Celtic for an undisclosed fee, reported to be in the region of £2.5 million, signing a five-year contract. He was assigned the number 19 shirt.

He made his debut on 29 January 2023, in a league game against Dundee United, replacing Kyogo Furuhashi in the 82nd minute of an eventual 2–0 win. Then, he scored his first goal for the Bhoys on 11 February, in a 5–1 Scottish Cup win over St. Mirren.

International career
Oh represented South Korea at the under-17, under-20 and under-23 youth international levels. He made his senior team debut on 11 November 2022 in a friendly match against Iceland.

Career statistics

Club

Honours
Suwon Samsung Bluewings
Korean FA Cup: 2019

Gimcheon Sangmu
K League 2: 2021

Celtic
 Scottish League Cup: 2022–23

References

External links 
 
 Oh Hyeon-gyu – National Team stats at KFA 

2001 births
Living people
People from Namyangju
South Korean footballers
Association football forwards
K League 1 players
K League 2 players
Scottish Professional Football League players
Suwon Samsung Bluewings players
Gimcheon Sangmu FC players
Celtic F.C. players
South Korea under-17 international footballers
South Korea under-20 international footballers
South Korea under-23 international footballers
South Korea international footballers
South Korean expatriate footballers
South Korean expatriate sportspeople in Scotland
Expatriate footballers in Scotland